Malachi Martin (born 1822) was the prison warden at Florida's first state penitentiary in Chattahoochee, Florida and a state legislator. He was renowned for barbarity and corruption including the use of prison labor for his personal benefit. Another account blames changing politics for the most horrific accounts. He served as speaker of the Florida House of Representatives. Martin, a Republican, was friends with Samuel Fleischman who consulted with him before being murdered by the Ku Klux Klan.

Malachi was put in charge of Florida's first state prison in 1871. He used prisoners to build houses for his profit and to tend his vineyards. The book The American Siberia; or, Fourteen years' experience in a southern convict camp (1891) by J. C. Powell described the abuse he carried out. After the prisoners were relocated in 1876 to a prison at Raiford, Florida, the prison was renovated for use as Florida State Hospital, where mental patients were incarcerated.

References

1822 births
Year of death missing
Speakers of the Florida House of Representatives
Republican Party members of the Florida House of Representatives
19th-century American politicians
Irish emigrants to the United States (before 1923)
American prison wardens